The Nieuport-Delage NiD 48 was a French single-engine parasol wing light fighter aircraft, designed and built in the 1920s.  Its performance was not markedly better than that of the much heavier Nieuport-Delage NiD 62 then going into production, so only two were flown.

Design and development

The Nieuport NiD 48 was designed for a French 1926 light fighter competition. Unlike many Nieuport designs of the period it was not a sesquiplane but a monoplane, its wing mounted like those of the sesquiplanes over the fuselage in parasol wing configuration. It looked much like a NiD 42 with its ancillary wing removed but had smaller dimensions and only was half the loaded weight. It had a straight-edged, constant chord wing with blunt tips, full span ailerons with a slightly curved trailing edges and a small cutout over the cockpit for better pilot visibility. As on the NiD 42, the wing was braced with Y-form struts from the undercarriage axle support structure, assisted by a cabane of two transverse inverted Vs from the fuselage in front of the cockpit.

Both NiD 48s built used Hispano-Suiza upright V-12 water-cooled engines, with a  12Jb in the first prototype and a  12Hb in the second, the NiD 48bis. Behind the engine the fuselage had a circular cross-section, with the single-seat open cockpit under the wing trailing edge, tapering to the tail. The cantilever tailplane was mounted at mid-fuselage height and was elliptical in plan with unbalanced elevators.  The fin was almost triangular but carried a round edged rudder, also unbalanced, which ended above the fuselage. The NiD 48 had a fixed conventional undercarriage, the mainwheels on a faired axle supported by a pair of rearward leaning V-struts which also carried rectangular radiators for engine cooling. There was a tail skid.

The first airframe was completed in October 1926 and used for static load testing. The first to fly began its official tests in May 1927, with the NiD 48bis following that September. Although lighter than the similarly powered NiD 62, in trials conducted in March 1928 the NiD 48bis bettered it significantly only in rate of climb. but since the NiD 62 was already in production it was decided not to proceed with the NiD 48.

Operational history

In July 1929 one of the prototypes went to Etampes as a trainer.

Specifications (Hispano-Suiza 12Jb engine)

References

Parasol-wing aircraft
1920s French fighter aircraft
 048
Single-engined tractor aircraft